MV Target is a semi-submersible heavy transport ship, built by Brodosplit in Yugoslavia.

History
Built in 1990 as a tanker, MV Jahre Target, MV Target is the second of six single hull tankers to be converted into heavy lift vessels. After completing submerging and sea trials, the former sealift vessel was delivered to the new owners, Dockwise on 24 December 2007.

Design
MV Target was converted at the COSCO shipyard in Nantong, China. A new midsection was fitted to the bow and aft sections of the single-hull tanker. She has a carrying capacity in excess of 35,000 tons and an unobstructed deck area measuring 44.5 m x 130 m.

Service
MV Target is designed to transport complex, high-value cargo, including semi-submersible and jack-up drilling units, as well as offshore structures. She is managed by Anglo-Eastern Ship Management who provide technical and crew management.

In 2009, MV Target transported the Royal Navy ice-strengthened survey ship,  from the Falkland Islands to Portsmouth.

Footnotes

Semi-submersibles
Ships built in Yugoslavia
1990 ships